Rail transport in Cardiff has developed to provide connections to many other major cities in the United Kingdom, and to provide an urban rail network for the city and its commuter towns in southeast Wales. Today, there are three train operating companies in Cardiff: Great Western Railway, CrossCountry and Transport for Wales.

Services to/from Cardiff

Transport for Wales
National
  –  –  –  –  –  –  –  – 
 Cardiff Central – Newport – Hereford –  –  – 
 Cardiff Central –  –  –  –  –  –  – 
 Cardiff Central – Newport –   – 
Regional
 Cardiff Central – Bridgend – Port Talbot Parkway –  – 
 Cardiff Central –  –  – 
Local
These services operate on the Valley Lines network –  an urban rail network centred on Cardiff that connects it to its commuter towns in South East Wales:
 Cardiff Central –  –  – Coryton
 Cardiff Central –  –  – 
 Cardiff Central –  – 
 Cardiff Central – Grangetown –  –  – 
 Cardiff Central – Grangetown – Dinas Powys – Barry –  –  – 
  – 
 Cardiff Central –  –  – 
 Cardiff Central – Cardiff Queen Street –  –  –  – 
 Cardiff Central – Cardiff Queen Street –  –  –  – 
 Cardiff Central – Cardiff Queen Street – Radyr – Pontypridd – Abercynon –  – 
 Cardiff Central – Cardiff Queen Street – Radyr – Pontypridd –  –  –

Great Western Railway
National
  –  –  –  –  – 
  –  –  –  – 
  –  –  – 
Regional
  –  –  – 
  –  –  –  – 

CrossCountry
National
  –  –  –  –  –

Stations in Cardiff
All 20 railway stations in Cardiff are owned by Network Rail and managed by Transport for Wales which also operates all train services at these stations, with the exception of Cardiff Central which is also served by CrossCountry and Great Western Railway. The stations form part of Cardiff's commuter rail network, colloquially known as Valley Lines

Cardiff Central is one of the United Kingdom's major railway stations, providing connections to Newport, Bristol, Bath, Reading, London, Southampton, Portsmouth, Gloucester, Cheltenham, Birmingham and Nottingham. It is located in the south of the Cardiff city centre

Cardiff Queen Street is the hub of the Valley Lines network, with all lines running through the station. It is located in Cardiff's eastern city centre.

Railway lines

These are the main rail lines that serve Cardiff. Most of the lines are Cardiff commuter lines that form the city's urban rail network.

South Wales Main Line

It diverges from the main line near Swindon, first passing through Bristol Parkway and continuing through the Severn Tunnel to Cardiff Central via Newport. The line continues from the city towards West Wales. The line between London and Cardiff has been electrified.

Butetown Line
The Butetown Line is a short line running from Cardiff Queen Street to Cardiff Bay. Rail services call only at those stations with a frequency of every 12 minutes.

Cardiff City Line
The Cardiff City Line is entirely within Cardiff running to its western suburbs. The line terminates at Radyr, after calling at Ninian Park, Fairwater and Danescourt. Rail services run to Cardiff Central and Queen Street every 30 minutes, and usually continue on the Coryton Line.

Coryton Line
The Coryton Line is entirely within Cardiff running to its northern suburbs. The line terminates at Coryton, after calling at stations in Heath, Ty Glas, Birchgrove, Rhiwbina and Whitchurch. Rail services run to Cardiff Central and Queen Street every 30 minutes, and usually continue on the Radyr Line.

Ebbw Valley Railway
The Ebbw Valley Railway was re-opened to passenger rail services in February 2008. The line provides an hourly service between Cardiff Central and Ebbw Vale Town. The line follows the South Wales Main Line eastbound out of Cardiff before diverging north and calling at Rogerstone, Risca and Pontymister, Crosskeys, Newbridge, Llanhilleth and Ebbw Vale Parkway.

Maesteg Line
The Maesteg Line runs from Cardiff to Maesteg in Bridgend County Borough. The line follows the South Wales Main Line through the Vale of Glamorgan until Bridgend, calling at minor stations which are not served by high speed services. The line then diverges northwards through Sarn and Tondu. Services run every hour to and from Cardiff, often extending to Cheltenham Spa.

Merthyr Line
The Merthyr Line runs northward out of Cardiff, calling at stations in the suburbs of Cathays, Llandaff and Radyr, where it connects with the City Line. It continues into Rhondda Cynon Taff, through Taffs Well, Treforest and Pontypridd. Frequencies on this stretch of the line are usually every 10 minutes.

After calling at Abercynon, the line splits into two branches; one to Merthyr Tydfil via Merthyr Vale and another to Aberdare via Mountain Ash. Frequencies are every 30 minutes on both branches and often link up with Vale of Glamorgan Line services to Barry Island or Bridgend via .

Rhondda Line
The Rhondda Line is a line that runs north from Cardiff through the Rhondda Valley to Treherbert. The line is shared with the Merthyr Line until Pontypridd. From there, the line diverges through Porth, Tonypandy and Treorchy amongst others.

Services run every 30 minutes and often continue through Cardiff onto the Vale of Glamorgan Line to Penarth or Barry Island.

Rhymney Line
The Rhymney Line is another line that runs northwards from Cardiff and calls at stations in the city suburbs of Heath, Llanishen and Lisvane before continuing to Caerphilly and places such as Ystrad Mynach, Hengoed and Bargoed.

Services on this stretch of line run every 15 minutes. Every hour, trains continue on the rest of the line to Rhymney. Trains often continue through Cardiff onto the Vale of Glamorgan Line to Penarth.

Vale of Glamorgan Line
The Vale of Glamorgan Line is a line that runs from Cardiff through the largely rural county of the Vale of Glamorgan to Bridgend. The line comprises three branches. Trains call at Grangetown in Cardiff before continuing on the main line to stations in Dinas Powys and Barry, or diverging onto a branch serving Penarth.

Frequencies to Penarth or to Barry Island are every 15 minutes, and to Bridgend via Cardiff Airport are every hour. Train services often continue after Cardiff Queen Street on the Merthyr, Rhondda or Rhymney Lines.

Main destinations
There are direct services from Cardiff Central to the following destinations, with the average scheduled journey time:

National

Regional/Local

Train operators

Current train operators

Former train operators

Former train operators

Transport connections

The Cardiff Waterbus towards Cardiff Bay stops at Taff Mead Embankment, near Central Station.

Taxi ranks are located outside Central Station, as is cycle parking which is also available at many other city stations.

Cardiff Airport connects with the Cardiff rail network at  station, from which free shuttle buses run to the departures terminal.

Future plans

The South Wales Metro System is a proposed major overhaul of the transport systems in South East Wales, including integration of heavy rail and development of light rail and bus-based public transport services around the hub of Cardiff Central.

The disused railway station in the St. Fagans area, in the west of the city, could be reopened to bolster transport links for a major Cardiff tourist attraction, under a proposal in March 2010 by former First Minister Rhodri Morgan AM and Cardiff West MP Kevin Brennan, follow predictions that visitor numbers to the National History Museum could top one million a year by 2017. By 2012, further submissions will be made to try to secure £8.7m of funding towards the project.

Network Rail is currently proposing adding an extra two platforms to both Cardiff Central and Cardiff Queen Street station, and installing a light rail metro system in the city.

See also
Transport in Cardiff
Transport in Wales

References

External links
Transport for Wales
Cross Country trains
Great Western Railway

 
Transport in Cardiff
 Railway stations
Rail transport in Wales